Paroles et Musique is a 1984 comedy-drama romance film directed and written by Élie Chouraqui and starring Catherine Deneuve and Christopher Lambert. It is also the film debut of Charlotte Gainsbourg.

Cast

 Catherine Deneuve as Margaux Marker
 Christopher Lambert as Jeremy
 Richard Anconina as Michel
 Jacques Perrin as Yves
 Nick Mancuso as Peter Marker
 Dayle Haddon as Corinne
 Charlotte Gainsbourg as Charlotte Marker
 Dominique Lavanant as Florence
 Franck Ayas as Elliot Marker
 Nelly Borgeaud as Julie
 László Szabó as Alain
 Lionel Rocheman as Gruber
 Stephanie Biddle as a Waitress/Singer
 Charles Biddle Jr. as a Waiter/Singer
 Didier Hoffmann as Robin
 Inigo Lezzi as Jean-Paul
 Julie Ravix as Claire
 Diane Markowitz as Leslie
 Yumi Fujimori as Switchboard Operator
 Warren 'Slim' Williams as Bus Driver

Release 
The film was released in France in 1984 by Acteurs Auteurs Associés and Soprafilms and in 1986 in America by International Spectrafilm. It was released on DVD in France in 2002 by Warner Vision France and in America in 2008 by Somerville House.

Soundtrack
The soundtrack was composed by Michel Legrand and Gene McDaniels, with musical coordination by Gilbert Marouani. It was produced by LEM America Inc. under the direction of McDaniels, for WEA Filipacchi Music. It was recorded at M1 Recording Studios in New York. The cover design is by François Plassat and was photographed by Bruno Clergue. Tracks 1, 2, 4, 6, 7 and 10 have vocals by Guy Thomas and Terry Lauber (in the original French film, the vocals are by the actors Christopher Lambert and Richard Anconina).

Awards and nominations

References

External links
 
 
 

1984 films
French romantic comedy-drama films
1980s French-language films
Films directed by Élie Chouraqui
Films scored by Michel Legrand
1980s French films